Receptor for activated C kinase 1 (RACK1), also known as guanine nucleotide-binding protein subunit beta-2-like 1 (GNB2L1), is a 35 kDa protein that in humans is encoded by the RACK1 gene.

Function 
RACK1 was originally isolated and identified as an intracellular protein receptor for protein kinase C, noting the significant homology to the beta subunit of heterotrimeric G proteins. Later studies established RACK1, and its yeast homolog Asc1, as a core ribosomal protein of the eukaryotic small (40S) ribosomal subunit. Much of the function of Asc1/RACK1 appears to result from its position on the 'head' of the 40S ribosomal subunit. Asc1/RACK1 participates in several aspects of eukaryotic translation and ribosome quality control, including IRES-mediated translation, non-stop decay, non-functional 18S ribosomal RNA decay, and frameshifting.

Interactions 

RACK1 is positioned at the solvent-exposed surface of the 40S ribosomal subunit, where it is held in place through contacts with both the 18S rRNA and other ribosomal proteins, including uS3, uS9, and eS17. Additionally, RACK1 has been shown to interact with:

 AGTRAP 
 Androgen receptor,
 CD18,
 CD29
 Cyclin A1
 EIF6,
 FYN,
 IFNAR2,
 Janus kinase 1
 OTUB1,
 P73,
 PDE4D,
 PRKCB1,
 PRKCE,
 PTPRM,
 RAS p21 protein activator 1,
 ST7,
 STAT1,
 Src, and
 Tyrosine kinase 2.

See also 
 Eukaryotic small ribosomal subunit (40S)
 Protein kinase C
 Heterotrimeric G protein

References

Further reading 

 
 
 
 
 
 
 
 
 
 
 
 
 
 
 
 
 
 

Ribosomal proteins